Ubah may refer to:

Ubah Ali (born 1996), social activist and feminist from Somaliland who campaigns against FGM
Ubah Hassan (born 1987), Somali-Canadian model
Bismark Ubah (born 1994), Nigerian professional footballer
Calister Ubah (born 1973), Nigerian sprinter
Ifeanyi Ubah (born 1971), Nigerian businessman, entrepreneur and Senator
John Ubah, Administrator of Kebbi State in Nigeria from August 1996 to August 1998
Rufina Ubah (born 1959), former Nigerian sprinter